Chaudhary Charan Singh Haryana Agricultural University (CCS HAU) is a public funded agricultural university located at Hisar in the Indian state of Haryana. It is one of the biggest agricultural universities in Asia. It is named after India's seventh prime minister, Chaudhary Charan Singh.

It was initially a satellite campus of Punjab Agricultural University at Hisar. After formation of Haryana, it was declared as an autonomous institution. It was established as a university by Haryana and Punjab Agricultural Universities Act, ratified 2 February 1970 and was named as Haryana Agricultural University. On 31 October 1991, it was renamed as Chaudhary Charan Singh Haryana Agricultural University. A. L. Fletcher was the first Vice-Chancellor of the university.

The university publishes the largest number of research papers among agricultural universities in India. It won the Indian Council of Agricultural Research's Award for the Best Institute in 1997. It contributed significantly to Green Revolution and White Revolution in India.

The Directorate of Extension Education started establishing Krishi Gyan Kendra (Agricultural Knowledge Centres) in districts of the state of Haryana from 1966. A total of eleven Krishi Gyan Kendra (KGK) were established till 1979. In 1989, the process was remodelled and the new centres have been named as Krishi Vigyan Kendra (Farm Service Centres). One Krishi Vigyan Kendra (KVK) has been established in each district of Haryana. They have been established to spread information about relevant technologies among farmers, rural youth and rural development agencies. They were established with funding from Indian Council of Agricultural Research. As of 2012, there are a total of 11 KGKs and 19 KVKs. They also provide vocational training on agriculture related courses.

The first Kisan Sewa Kendra (Agricultural Technology Information Centre) was established at the university main campus in 2002. As of 2012, there are a total of three Kisan Sewa Kendra (KSKs). Seeds of various crops, fruits, vegetables, fertilisers and Animal products are provided to farmers at subsidised rates through these centres. Toll-free helpline agricultural services are also provided to farmers through the KSKs.

Krishi Gyan Kendra

Krishi Vigyan Kendra

Kisan Sewa Kendra

Notes
  Krishi Vigyan Kendra was established at Gurgaon in 1970 and was shifted to Mewat in 2002.

See also

 List of agricultural universities and colleges
 Agricultural Universities (India)
 Indian Council of Agricultural Research
 Krishi Vigyan Kendra, Kannur
 Krishi Vigyan Kendra, Jalgaon Jamod

References

External links

 Official website of CCS HAU

Education in Haryana
Ccs Hau
Indian Council of Agricultural Research
Agriculture in Haryana